Camoletti is a surname. Notable people with the name include:

 Marc Camoletti (playwright) (playwright) (1923–2003), French playwright
 Marc Camoletti (architect) (1857–1940), Swiss architect; namesake and grandfather of the playwright
 Pierre Camoletti, a Swiss sailor

Italian-language surnames